Lee M. Thurston High School is a public high school in Redford, Michigan, United States in the suburban Detroit area. The school is a part of the South Redford School District.

The school was completed in 1956. Recently THS received the rank of 11th among Michigan schools in Newsweek's top 1,000 high schools list. Thirty percent of Thurston High School receives subsidized lunch.

Notable alumni
Eric Wilson, American football player
Jim "JJ" Johnson, Detroit Radio personality

References

External links
 Thurston High School's official site

Public high schools in Michigan
Educational institutions established in 1953
Schools in Wayne County, Michigan
1953 establishments in Michigan